Racers (Gonshchiki) is a 1972 Soviet drama film directed by Igor Maslennikov.

Plot 
The film talks about the conflict between two racing drivers: an aging master of sports and his ambitious student.

Cast 
 Yevgeny Leonov
 Oleg Yankovsky
 Georgiy Burkov
 Larisa Luzhina
 Armen Dzhigarkhanyan
 Leonhard Merzin
 Nikolai Ferapontov		
 Olga Rolich		
 Andrei Gretsov	
 Boris Arakelov

References

External links 
 

1972 films
1970s Russian-language films
Soviet drama films
1972 drama films
1970s drama road movies